Carnmore GAA is a Gaelic Athletic Association club located in the village of Carnmore in the southern end of Claregalway, approximately eight miles east of Galway city in County Galway, Ireland.  The club is almost exclusively concerned with hurling.

Honours

Galway Senior Hurling Championship:
Runner-up (6): 1947, 1971, 1975, 1992, 1993, 1996
Galway Minor Hurling Championship:

Minor A 2019

Minor B 1992,2021

References

External links
Official Club website
Carnmore GAA on gaainfo.com (archived)

Gaelic games clubs in County Galway
Hurling clubs in County Galway